Boss Engira Bhaskaran is a 2010 Indian Tamil-language romantic comedy film written and directed by M. Rajesh who earlier directed Siva Manasula Sakthi (2009). Starring Arya, Nayanthara and Santhanam in lead roles, the film is produced by K. S. Sreenivasan and features music scored by Yuvan Shankar Raja and cinematography handled by Sakthi Saravanan.

The film revolves around a young happy-go-lucky man, Bhaskaran, who is unemployed and lives an easygoing life, neglecting his career and future. When he meets a young girl, Chandrika, in whom he falls in love, he is bound to change his lifestyle, in order to marry her eventually. The film released on 10 September 2010 to highly positive reviews and also became commercially successful.

The film was remade in Kannada as Parijatha (2011) and in Bengali as Raja Rani Raji (2018).

Plot 
Bhaskaran is a happy-go-lucky youth in Kumbakonam who is yet to complete his B. A. Degree, writing arrear examinations for years. His only friend, Nallathambi, owns a barber hair saloon shop, which he received as dowry for marrying a woman who was two months pregnant. Bhaskaran, during an arrear exam, happens to meet  Chandrika, a lecturer, and instantly gets attracted to her, though she disapproves of him because he attempted to copy during the exam.

Bhaskaran lives with his widowed mother Sivakami, his older brother Saravanan (a veterinarian) and his younger sister Nithya, who is a college student wanting to become a TV compere. When Saravanan falls in love and marries Nandhini, Bhaskaran discovers that Nandhini's younger sister is Chandrika, and wishes to marry her. When he approaches his family for the alliance, his unemployment is repeatedly mentioned, rankling him, so he leaves his house to prove himself.

Bhaskaran faces many obstacles in his path to prove himself. He is insulted by Chandrika's father, Shanmugasundaram, and does not even have a place to live. After many difficulties, Bhaskaran, with the support of Nallathambi, establishes a tutorial for Class X students. Nallathambi goes and gets money from Velpandi, a local don, who signs an agreement that if his son Paalpandi does not pass in his exam, he will take Nallathambi's property and make him work in his cow dung place.

Velpandi reveals his family history: his father, in his Class X examination, forced his teacher to write the exam. Velpandi, during his exam, wrote only four words in his paper with an aruval symbol, blackmailing the teacher into making him pass or risk being killed. Velpandi's son Paalpandi sleeps in the exam hall and if anybody tries to wake him, he will bite the teacher's hand.

However, in the end, Paalpandi starts to study and makes others listen in the class when Bhaskaran appoints a blind teacher. Despite early setbacks, Bhaskaran makes a very heavy profit on the deal, while his students top in the state and Paalpandi passes in his exam with good marks. Velpandi tears the agreement, offers Nallathambi a huge amount of money with no interest and appreciates him for making Paalpandi pass in the exams. It also convinces Chandrika, who eventually reciprocates his love. However, Shanmugasundaram is against the marriage as he had once been insulted by a drunk Nallathambi as revenge for not having sanctioned a loan to Bhaskaran.

Shiva, a supposed teetotaller and the son of a businessman who is Shanmugasundram's friend, is introduced as Chandrika's prospective groom. Bhaskaran then confronts Shiva, revealing to him that he loves Chandrika. The two get into a fight soon after, but when Shanmugasundaram arrives at the spot, he learns the truth: Shiva and Bhaskaran are now friends and the whole fight was just a drama set by Nallathambi, Shiva supports their marriage. Under Shiva and Bhaskaran's orders, a disappointed Shanmugasundaram is forced to unite Bhaskaran and Chandrika. In the end, it is revealed that the director called Shiva and told him to stop fighting and unite Bhaskaran and Chandrika.

Cast 

 Arya as Bhaskaran
 Santhanam as "Thala Thalapathy" Nallathambi
 Nayanthara as Chandrika
 Subbu Panchu as Saravanan
 Chitra Lakshmanan as Shanmugasundaram (Mongoose Mandaiyan)
 Rajendran as Velpandi
 Ashvin Raja as Paalpandi
 Vijaylakshmi as Nandhini Saravanan
 Lakshmi Ramakrishnan as Sivakami
 Lollu Sabha Swaminathan as Venkat, Bhaskaran's Arrear Friend
 Monisha  as Nithya
 Poorni as Annapoorani
 Jiiva in a guest appearance as Shiva
 Shakeela as in a guest appearance as Parimala
 Maran

Production 
The film was officially launched on 19 November 2009 at the AVM Studios, with the film starting shooting in December first week. Rajesh, following his sleeper hit Siva Manasula Sakthi, decided to make another comedy film and to cast Arya, who appeared in a cameo role in Siva Manasula Sakthi, in the titular role, while Jiiva in return would make a cameo appearance in the film. As the film's backdrop is set to be both village as well as city, the film was shot at various location including Thanjavur, Mysore and Trichy.<ref name=shoot>{{cite news|last=V Lakshmi|title=Director Rajesh gets talking to Whatts Hot on his upcoming project Boss Engira Baskaran.....|url=http://epaper.timesofindia.com/Default/Scripting/ArticleWin.asp?From=Archive&Source=Page&Skin=TOINEW&BaseHref=TOICH%2F2010%2F08%2F06&ViewMode=GIF&PageLabel=30&EntityId=Ar03002&AppName=1|access-date=12 March 2014|newspaper=The Times of India|archive-date=12 March 2014|archive-url=https://web.archive.org/web/20140312224802/http://epaper.timesofindia.com/Default/Scripting/ArticleWin.asp?From=Archive&Source=Page&Skin=TOINEW&BaseHref=TOICH%2F2010%2F08%2F06&ViewMode=GIF&PageLabel=30&EntityId=Ar03002&AppName=1|url-status=live}}</ref> A major part of the film was filmed at Kumbakonam, while a few scenes were shot in Chennai as well. Shooting was also carried on in the Swiss Alps, where some song sequences were picturized. Principal photography ended on 3 August 2010 with the completion of the last song that was canned at a set erected at Binny Mills near Chennai. Arya revealed that the script went through changes during production, with Rajesh eventually opting not to include portions where Bhaskaran's brother gets killed in the film. Instead of implementing a revenge script, Rajesh chose to make it a full-length comedy.

While Vasan Visual Ventures that produced Arya's Naan Kadavul, produced this film as well, Arya purchased the rights in the midst to release it under his own production banner "The Show People". The film's distribution rights, however, were again acquired by Red Giant Movies, led by Udhayanidhi Stalin, who would enact the lead role in Rajesh's next project.

 Soundtrack 

Following the success of Siva Manasula Sakthi, Yuvan Shankar Raja composed the musical score and soundtrack of Boss Engira Bhaskaran, too. The soundtrack album, which was released on 27 August 2010 at Sathyam Cinemas, contains 5 tracks, featuring lyrics penned by Na. Muthukumar. The soundtrack received positive response.

 Release 
In November 2011, Boss Engira Bhaskaran was shown at the International Tamil Film Festival held in Uglich, Russia, alongside Thillana Mohanambal (1968), Chandramukhi (2005), Sivaji (2007), Angadi Theru (2010), Thenmerku Paruvakaatru (2010) and Ko (2011).  The film was eventually dubbed into Telugu as Nene Ambani which released on 17 December 2010.

 Box office Boss Engira Bhaskaran sold 7.3 million tickets worldwide. It released on Eid day, the end of Ramadan, opening across 240 screens in Tamil Nadu with reportedly 95.5% average theatre occupancy, which, according to trade sources, was the best ever first day opening for Arya then, which resulted in an increase of the number of shows and screens. In its opening weekend, the film was said to have earned 58 lakh in Chennai, as reported by Behindwoods, while according to Sify.com, it grossed 65 lakh. At the end of the second weekend, the film had netted 10 crore from 275 screens.

 Critical response 
Boss Engira Bhaskaran received positive reviews upon release. Sify stated that "Rajesh has pulled off the impossible, making a family comedy work a second time armed with nothing more than a few situational gaffes and couple of funny dialogues. It’s pure escapist fare and will work big time, as there is paucity of healthy entertainment for the family audiences." Indiaglitz wrote "Rajesh has made spoof of some contemporary Tamil films in an enjoyable manner." and "Boss Engira Baskaran is right there oozing with abundant energy and unlimited fun. Kudos to Udhayanidhi for choosing quality films with varied stories that leave an impression with the masses." Chennai Online specially pointed out the plus points of the film "The comic scenes aided by dialogues and the bonding between the two friends are a huge plus and reason enough to see the movie. The casting of each character has been aptly done with no room for excess anywhere making for one smooth ride all through. Nayan and Arya make an adequate pair though there are no great sparks of chemistry between them. However Nayan does make a pretty picture throughout."Behindwoods gave 2.5 out of 5 and expressed that "Director Rajesh might just pull it off this time too because he’s got everything right for a comic caper. He also efficiently camouflages the saggy little portions in both the halves of his movie with crisply written dialogues. Perfect for a weekend in which you decide not to give your brain much work." A critic from the Times of India'' gave 3 out of 5 and praised the film saying "When the director shows Boss watching 'Annamalai' on TV and getting inspired, you are not surprised. But his excuses, when facing various career options, make Boss an original. The tutorial college angle may be predictable, but soon humour is back on track, and it is enjoyable. You will also come away with some amazing performances."

Awards

Legacy 
The dialogue "Nanbenda" spoken by Santhanam in the film became famous and went viral after the release. The dialogue has inspired a film of same name. "The title, which means friend, was apt because it's a story about two friends. So we felt it will make sense to use it," the film's director Jagadish said. Jagadish is the former associate of filmmaker Rajesh. Another term used by Santhanam in the film, "Appatakkar" (know-all) also gained popularity.

References

External links 
 

Films shot in Tiruchirappalli
2010 romantic comedy films
2010 films
2010s Tamil-language films
Indian romantic comedy films
Films scored by Yuvan Shankar Raja
Tamil films remade in other languages
Films directed by M. Rajesh